Yves Loday (born 27 September 1955) is a French sailor who competed in the 1992 Summer Olympics in Barcelona, where he won gold medal in the Tornado Class together with Nicolas Hénard.
Loday is the designer of the Extreme 40 sailing catamaran, which is used in the Extreme Sailing Series very high speed regattas.

References

External links
 
 
 

1955 births
French male sailors (sport)
Sailors at the 1984 Summer Olympics – Tornado
Sailors at the 1992 Summer Olympics – Tornado
Olympic sailors of France
Olympic gold medalists for France
Living people
Olympic medalists in sailing
Medalists at the 1992 Summer Olympics